

Events
January – Shankar Mahadevan is awarded the Padma Shri by the Indian government for his contributions to Film Music.
March 1 – Opening of the 15th Jakarta International Java Jazz Festival
March 18 – Opening night of "Sadhu For The Music", a unity concert arranged by Imee Ooi.
April 30 – Seoul Philharmonic Orchestra announces that Osmo Vänskä will be its next musical director, as from January 2020.
June 13 – The Chinese Opera Festival opens at the Xiqu Centre in Kowloon.

Albums
IV of Spades - ClapClapClap! (January 18)
Arinjoy Trio - Arinjoy Trio (March)
Babymetal - Metal Galaxy (October 8)
Band-Maid - Conqueror (December 11)
Soumik Datta - King of Ghosts
December Avenue - Langit Mong Bughaw (December 20)
The Hu - The Gereg (September 13)
iKon - The New Kids (January 7)
Isyana Sarasvati - Lexicon (November 29)
Monsta X - Take.2 We Are Here (February 18)
Parekh & Singh - Science City (May 12)
Astha Raut - Aadhar 2 (November 28)

Classical
Akira Nishimura – Azure Dragon (for string quartet)

Opera
 Aftab Darvishi and Miranda Lakerveld – Turan Dokht
Keith Lai – Wenguang Explores the Valley
Akira Nishimura - Asters

Film and TV scores
4 Musics, Nadirshah, Dhanush and Madhu Vasudevan - Brother's Day
Yuki Hayashi - Star Twinkle PreCure
Ilaiyaraaja - Thamilarasan
M. Jayachandran - Mamangam

Musical films
A Mero Hajur 3 (Nepal)
Ajab Sanju Ra Gajab Love (India - Odia)
Chaal Jeevi Laiye! (India - Gujarati)
Cheer Boys!! (Japan)
Chitralahari (India - Telugu)
Dearest Anita (Hong Kong)
Ek Ladki Ko Dekha Toh Aisa Laga (India - Hindi)
Fall in Love at First Kiss (Taiwan)
Gully Boy (India - Hindi)
I Love You, You’re Perfect, Now Change (China)
Laal Kabootar (Pakistan)
Love Live! Sunshine!! (Japan)
Neeyum Njanum (India - Malayalam)
Oru Adaar Love (India - Malayalam)

Deaths
January 16 – Brian Velasco, born 1977), Filipino drummer (Razorback)
January 17 – S. Balakrishnan, 70, Indian film score composer and music director
January 22 – Ahmed Imtiaz Bulbul, 63, Bangladeshi lyricist, composer and music director
January 27 – Pepe Smith, 71, Filipino rock singer and guitarist (Juan de la Cruz Band, Speed, Glue & Shinki, Asin)
March 23 – Shahnaz Rahmatullah, 66, Bangladeshi playback singer
April 20 
Amar Pal, 96, folk singer
Wu Yili, 89, Chinese-Singaporean classical pianist
May 12 - Hiralal Yadav, 93, Indian folk singer.
July 19 - Yao Lee, 96, Chinese popular singer
August 1 - , 51, Indonesian actor and singer.
August 19 - Mohammed Zahur Khayyam, 92, Indian music director and composer (Kabhie Kabhie, Umrao Jaan, Dil-e-Nadaan), lung infection.
September 12 - Ida Laila, 76, Indonesian singer
November 8 - Ramakant Gundecha, Indian Dhrupad performer
November 18 - Norodom Buppha Devi, 76, Cambodian royal and prima ballerina, Minister of Culture and Fine Arts (1998–2004). was a Cambodian princess, dancer and director of the Royal Ballet of Cambodia.
November 24
Goo Hara, 28, South Korean singer (suicide)
Mobarak Hossain Khan, 81, Bangladeshi musicologist, musician, and writer
November 27 - He Sukun, 25, Chinese singer (suicide)
December 1 - Michael Lai, 73, Chinese composer and actor
December 26 - Nguyễn Văn Tý, 94, Vietnamese composer

By country 
 2019 in Chinese music
 2019 in Japanese music
 2019 in Philippine music
 2019 in South Korean music

See also 
 2019 in music

References 

Asia
Asian music
2019 in Asia